Wilfredo Buendia Revillame (born January 27, 1961), popularly known as Willie Revillame, is a Filipino television host, comedian, drummer, singer, songwriter, actor, and businessman.

Career
Revillame started out as the host of GMA Network's noontime variety program Lunch Date in the late 1980s together with Randy Santiago. In 1995–1997, Revillame sang the theme song of the TV drama series Villa Quintana as a duet with Rockstar 2. He later began to appear on different movies, playing sidekick to big-named stars.

In 1998, he started co-hosting the ABS-CBN noontime show 'Sang Linggo nAPO Sila. After the show was cancelled to make way for his big break in Magandang Tanghali Bayan, he also started appearing in Richard Loves Lucy. Other shows he hosted within the network were Willingly Yours, Masayang Tanghali Bayan and Wowowee, as well as TV5 variety programs like Willing Willie, Wil Time Bigtime and Wowowillie.

On March 20, 2015, Revillame marked his homecoming in GMA Network (his original home network), his long-awaited return to Philippine showbiz and to Philippine television via his newest weekly-variety program Wowowin, airing on GMA Network every Sunday afternoon since May 10, 2015 until it became a weekday-variety program on February 1, 2016, due to the huge popularity of the show. On February 5, 2022, GMA Network announced that Revillame's contract with the network will end on February 15, 2022. His program, Wowowin aired its final broadcast on February 11, 2022, until it's resumption on All TV on September 13.

Business ventures
Revillame is known for developing a business, the Wil Tower Mall near ABS-CBN Eugenio Lopez Drive in Quezon City with business partner Manny Villar. It held its grand opening on September 15, 2013. Revillame is also a former owner of the restaurants W Bar and Wil Steak Town at Wil Events Place located near Wil Tower Mall and ABS-CBN along Sgt. Esguerra Avenue in South Triangle, Diliman, Quezon City. Wil Tower Mall was developed by the real estate firm Vista Land, but Revillame's holdings were sold to his business partner and friend, former Senator Manny Villar.

Revillame was interviewed for the April 2015 episode of Kapuso Mo, Jessica Soho at his own rest house in Tagaytay City after the signing of contract with GMA Network. During the interview, GMA 7 broadcast journalist Jessica Soho said that Revillame is planning to build a 5-star resort-hotel located within the 5 hectare lot that he acquired from the Madrigal family. His own rest house is also located within the same lot.

Following the acquisition of Advanced Media Broadcasting System by the Villar family, Villar tapped Revillame to invest in the company's plans on broadcast ventures.

Personal life
Revillame was first married to actress Princess Punzalan. In March 2005, he married Liz Almoro in a civil ceremony at Lipa, Batangas, officiated by Mayor Vilma Santos. This was followed by a church wedding in June 2005. Their marriage was annulled in 2008.

Revillame has four children including Meryll Soriano.

Controversies

PhilSports Stadium stampede
On February 4, 2006, while Willie was hosting Wowowee, the PhilSports Arena stampede occurred.

On August 25, 2007, the Department of Justice dismissed criminal charges against Revillame in connection with the stampede. However, Justice Secretary Raul M. Gonzalez affirmed the charge against 14 others, including ABS-CBN officials.

Cory Aquino live funeral coverage controversy
In the August 3, 2009 episode of Wowowee, during which the show was interrupted for live coverage of the transfer of former President Cory Aquino's remains from La Salle Greenhills to the Manila Cathedral, Revillame said that he could not make people happy while the entire country was mourning. The Alliance of Filipino Journalists denounced his remarks as a sign of disrespect towards Aquino. Revillame said he had no intention of defaming the former president and her family. ABS-CBN senior executive Cory Vidanes said that the network supported Revillame's action, stating that his outburst did not run afoul of the Broadcast Code of the Philippines. Network entertainment official Johnny Manahan said Revillame was correct in saying that the footage should not have been inserted, but the way he said it was wrong.

Jobert Sucaldito controversy
On May 4, 2010, Revillame went into another on-air tirade on his now-defunct noontime show "Wowowee", this time directing his anger at entertainment columnist and DZMM Radio host Jobert Sucaldito. Without mentioning him by name, he said he had enough of Sucaldito's alleged criticisms against the show having high-school contestants whose grades were below the passing mark for the Willie of Fortune segment and also ridiculing them on-screen. He threatened to resign from the show unless the ABS-CBN management dismissed Sucaldito, who described Revillame's rant as being "pikon" (Tagalog slang meaning 'short-tempered'). He went on an indefinite leave three weeks later after the network declined his resignation letter.

Legal troubles with ABS-CBN
In a press conference on August 9, 2010, Revillame announced that he was ending his contract with ABS-CBN, even if it is supposed to expire in September 2011. He also accused ABS-CBN of violating several provisions in his contract. He narrated that his decision came out of meetings between ABS-CBN production head Linggit Tan and network president Charo Santos-Concio regarding a return to the show on July 31. However, on July 20, Tan said the management will replace Wowowee with a new show on July 31 and also offered him a one-hour weekly show. She added negative feedback still prevailed among network employees about him going to work again. Despite the move, the network stated that Revillame's Wowowee tirade only highlighted his arrogance and stressed that the contract is still in effect.

Child abuse case
On March 12, 2011, a "macho dance" by an apparently unhappy six-year-old boy on Revillame's primetime show, Willing Willie, resulted in criticism, including the Philippine Department of Social Welfare and Development describing it as a case of child abuse. Revillame "sincerely and deeply" apologized for the segment, “which viewers may have found offensive or in bad taste.” The Commission on Human Rights pursued an investigation of the program for violating the law. In October 2015, the Court of Appeals allowed the arrest and prosecution of Revillame over the case. Atty. Nards de Vera, lawyer of Revillame, clarified in a GMA News article that Revillame has already posted the bail for the two cases in September 2013, and does not need the warrant of arrest served against his client.
On April 11, 2016, the 3rd division of the Court of Appeal (CA) had affirmed the Regional Trial Court Quezon City Judge Roberto Buenaventura Decision. The CA said that Judge Buenaventura hadn't committed no grave abuse of discretion. In the CA's Decision, written by Justice Maria Luisa Quijano-Padilla, on the arrest and to bring to trial Willie Revillame, they said, " “as there is probable cause for the petitioner’s commission of a crime, his arrest and arraignment should now ensue so that this case may properly proceed to trial, where the merits of both parties’ evidence and allegations may be weighed.”

Filmography

Films

Television

Awards
Best Male TV Host (2005 and 2007) - Won
Consumers Award Outstanding Variety Show (2008) - Won
Consumers Award Outstanding Male TV Host (2008) - Won
Novelty Singer of the Year (2010) - Won
2011 - PMPC Star Awards for TV - Best Variety Show (as Willing Willie)
Celebrity Inductee, Eastwood City Walk Of Fame Philippines 2014- Won
2015 - PMPC Star Awards for TV - Best Game Show (Wowowin of GMA-7)
2015 - PMPC Star Awards for TV - Best Male Game Show Host
2016 - Inding-Indie Short Film Festival - Best Public Service TV Personality
2016 - Inding Indie Short Film Festival - Best Public Service TV Program of the Decade (Wowowin of GMA-7)
2016 - PMPC Star Awards for TV - Best Game Show (Wowowin of GMA-7)
2016 - Illumine Awards for Television (Global City Innovative College) - Most Innovative Game Show (Wowowin of GMA-7)
2017 - NwSSU Students Choice Awards for Radio and Television (Northwest Samar State University) - Best Game Show (Wowowin of GMA-7)

References

External links

GMA Network profile

 
1961 births
Living people
Filipino television variety show hosts
Filipino game show hosts
21st-century Filipino businesspeople
20th-century Filipino male singers
Filipino male comedians
People from Cabanatuan
Male actors from Nueva Ecija
Singers from Nueva Ecija
GMA Network personalities
ABS-CBN personalities
Intercontinental Broadcasting Corporation personalities
TV5 (Philippine TV network) personalities
Radio Philippines Network personalities
Internet memes
Universal Records (Philippines) artists
Star Music artists
Viva Records (Philippines) artists
GMA Music artists